661 Cloelia is a minor planet orbiting the Sun that was discovered by American astronomer Joel Hastings Metcalf on February 22, 1908.

Cloelia is a member of the dynamic Eos family of asteroids that most likely formed as the result of a collisional breakup of a parent body.

The planet is named after the Ancient Roman woman Cloelia.
The name may have been inspired by the asteroid's provisional designation 1908 CL.

References

External links
 
 

Eos asteroids
Cloelia
Cloelia
S-type asteroids (Tholen)
K-type asteroids (SMASS)
19080222
Cultural depictions of Cloelia